A sea witch is a kind of witch appearing in traditional folklore. 

Sea Witch may also refer to:
 Sea Witch (clipper), an 1853 American clipper ship
 Sea Witch (1848 barque), a British opium clipper
 Sea Witch (container ship)
 Sea Witch (lure), an artificial fishing lure
 MS Sea Witch (1940)  1940 cargo ship